Endika Irigoien Bravo (born 25 January 1997) is a Spanish professional footballer who plays for CA Osasuna B as a left-back.

Club career
Born in Pamplona, Navarre, Irigoien represented CA Osasuna as a youth. He made his senior debut with the reserves on 29 May 2016, starting in a 1–0 home win against AE Prat for the 2016 Tercera División play-offs.

Irigoien subsequently became a regular starter for the B-side, and renewed his contract on 26 June 2018. He made his first-team debut on 12 September, starting in a 1–2 home loss against CF Reus Deportiu, for the season's Copa del Rey.

Irigoien scored his first senior goal on 27 October 2018, netting the game's only in a home success over Beti Kozkor KE. He made his Segunda División debut the following 2 March, coming on as a second-half substitute for Carlos Clerc in a 1–0 home win against Gimnàstic de Tarragona.

Honours
Osasuna
Segunda División: 2018–19

References

External links

1997 births
Living people
Footballers from Pamplona
Spanish footballers
Association football defenders
Segunda División players
Segunda División B players
Tercera División players
CA Osasuna B players
CA Osasuna players